Mardi Gras is a 1943 American short musical film directed by Hugh Bennett. It was nominated for an Academy Award at the 16th Academy Awards for Best Short Subject (Two-Reel).

Cast
 Betty Jane Rhodes as Suzy Brown (as Betty Rhodes)
 Johnnie Johnston as Johnnie Jones (as Johnnie Johnston)
 Val Setz as Juggler
 Adriana as Comedy Trampoline Act (as Adriana and Charley)
 Charley as Comedy Trampoline Act (as Adriana and Charley)
 George Rogers as Dance Specialty (as Rogers Trio)
 Dorothy Rogers as Dance Specialty (as Rogers Trio)
 Don Kramer as Dance Specialty (as Rogers Trio)
 Bert Roach as Chamberlain
 Douglas Wood as Harrison Piske
 Winifred Harris as Mrs. Piske
 Don Wilson as Announcer

References

External links
 

1943 films
1943 musical films
1943 short films
American musical films
American short films
1940s English-language films
Films directed by Hugh Bennett
1940s American films